The 2009 UEM 500cc Sidecar Final was a grasstrack sidecar racing event held in Wimborne Minster, Dorset. The meeting took place in Pilford Farm, Uddens on Sunday 13 September 2009. It also incorporated The 2009 Wimborne Whoppa, which was the 40th anniversary of the event.

The UEM 500cc Sidecar Final

Positions

The 2009 Wimborne Whoppa

500cc Solos

500cc Sidecars

1000cc Sidecars

Sidecar racing
2009 in track racing